Kalam Marunnu is a 1955 Indian Malayalam-language film, directed by R. Velappan Nair and produced by Swami Narayanan. The film stars Prem Nazir and Kumari Thankam. The film had musical score by G. Devarajan and Br. Lakshmanan.

Cast
 Sathyan
 K. P. A. C. Sulochana
 Thikkurissy Sukumaran Nair
 Chandni (Old)
 Kambissery Karunakaran
 O. Madhavan
 T. S. Muthaiah
 Pankajavalli

References

External links
 

1955 films
1950s Malayalam-language films
Films scored by Br Lakshmanan